Live Feed is a 2006 horror film directed by Ryan Nicholson and starring Kevan Ohtsji, Taayla Markell and Stephen Chang.

Cast 
 Kevan Ohtsji - Miles
 Taayla Markell - Emily
 Stephen Chang - The Boss
 Colin Foo - Shards
 Greg Chan - The Butcher
 Rob Scattergood - Darren

References

External links

Schnittbericht: Live Feed (SPIO/JK - Unrated US DVD)

2006 films
2006 horror films
2000s comedy horror films
English-language Canadian films
Canadian independent films
Canadian comedy horror films
Films directed by Ryan Nicholson
2000s Cantonese-language films
Films shot in Vancouver
Films about snuff films
Canadian splatter films
2006 comedy films
2000s Canadian films